The 97th District of the Iowa House of Representatives in the state of Iowa.

Current elected officials
Norlin Mommsen is the representative currently representing the district.

Past representatives
The district has previously been represented by:
 James H. Schwartz, 1971–1973
 Lillian McElroy, 1973–1977
 William H. Harbor, 1977–1983
 Wendell C. Pellett, 1983–1991
 Richard B. Weidman, 1991–1993
 Gregory A. Spenner, 1993–1995
 Dave Heaton, 1995–2003
 Effie Boggess, 2003–2005
 Rich Anderson, 2005–2013
 Steven Olson, 2013–2015
 Norlin Mommsen, 2015–present

References

097